Occidental Mindoro's at-large congressional district is the sole congressional district of the Philippines in the province of Occidental Mindoro. Also known as Occidental Mindoro's lone district, it has been represented in the House of Representatives of the Philippines since 1952. It first elected a representative provincewide at-large for the 2nd Congress of the Third Philippine Republic following the dissolution of the old Mindoro province under Republic Act No. 505 on June 13, 1950. It has remained a single-member district even under the Fourth Philippine Republic parliament known as the Regular Batasang Pambansa from 1984 to 1986.

The district is currently represented in the 19th Congress by Leody "Odie" Tarriela of the Pederalismo ng Dugong Dakilang Samahan (PDDS).

Representation history

Election results

2022

2019

2016

2013

2010

See also
Legislative districts of Occidental Mindoro

References

Congressional districts of the Philippines
Politics of Occidental Mindoro
1950 establishments in the Philippines
At-large congressional districts of the Philippines
Congressional districts of Mimaropa
Constituencies established in 1950
Constituencies disestablished in 1972
Constituencies established in 1984